Balagannakh is the name of several rural localities in the Sakha Republic, Russia:
Balagannakh, Olyokminsky District, Sakha Republic, a selo in Khorinsky Rural Okrug of Olyokminsky District
Balagannakh, Ust-Aldansky District, Sakha Republic, a selo in Kurbusakhsky Rural Okrug of Ust-Aldansky District
Balagannakh, Verkhnevilyuysky District, Sakha Republic, a selo in Balagannakhsky Rural Okrug of Verkhnevilyuysky District